The AFL Commission is the governing body of the Australian Football League Limited (AFL), its subsidiaries and controlled entities. Richard Goyder has been chairman since 4 April 2017, replacing Mike Fitzpatrick.

It was formed in 1985 as the VFL Commission, and gained its current name in 1990 (in conjunction with the renaming of the VFL competition to the Australian Football League). 

Its constitution self-proclaims the commission to be the "keeper of the code" responsible for the sport of Australian football. As part of its role, the Commission is responsible for the Laws of Australian Football. It is also responsible for worldwide player acknowledgement through the Australian Football Hall of Fame, All-Australian team and World (formerly All-International) Team. 

The Commission controls the AFL competition and maintains a professional talent pathway for players through the AFL Draft, AFL Draft Combine, AFL Academy and academies through its member clubs and affiliated bodies, Underage Men's and Underage women's championships, the Australian Football (AFL) International Cup and through its worldwide affiliates, numerous regional representative tournaments. 

The Commission organises the highest level of representative competition in Australia, being responsible for senior State of Origin competition since 1991, overseeing their cessation in 1999, and, since 1998, Australia's involvement in the International Rules Series.

Scope of governance
The AFL Commission has been responsible for the administration of the AFL competition since 1993, when the AFL Board of Directors voted itself out of existence after 96 years of operation. Its constitution self-proclaims the Commission to be the "keeper of the code" responsible for the sport of Australian football. 

The Commission later became  responsible for the national administration of the sport (since 1995, when the Australian National Football Council ceased operations after 89 years), as well as its international administration (since 2002, when it absorbed the International Australian Football Council) and the administration of women's football (since 2010, when it took over the operations of Women's Football Australia, which ceased operations in 2015).

Leagues affiliated with or owned by the AFL Commission have names beginning with AFL, and incorporate the AFL logo, and now owns the governing body for Australia's most populous eastern region through the AFL NSW/ACT and has strong affiliations with all other states. The AFL also promotes and brands the sport under its own name instead of the official name of Australian Football, especially in developing areas where the sport is not well known and the AFL has a major stake in the local governing bodies.

The ten commissioners are elected by the 18 AFL clubs, with each of the 18 clubs entitled to make nominations, but other Australian Football leagues, associations and clubs do not have any control or representation.

The AFL Commission's primary role is to oversee the profitability of its competitions, its primary competitions being the AFL and AFL Women's. As such, it has a direct stake in many of its member clubs. 

It also approves the administration of new club licenses, and has been involved in the expansion of the national competition since 1987, being instrumental in the merger that created the Brisbane Lions. The Commission also fully owns the Greater Western Sydney Giants. Other clubs to have an AFL Commission appointed board include the Sydney Swans, Gold Coast Suns, Adelaide Football Club and Port Adelaide Football Club. The Commission operates a Competitive Balance Fund, which redistributes profits to the clubs most in need to help ensure that all of its member clubs are financially sustainable in the long-term.

Financially, the Commission is highly co-dependent on the success of the AFL and the majority of its funding comes from AFL competition broadcasting rights. The 2025-2031 rights will earn $4.5 billion, the most lucrative in Australian sporting history. The Commission distributes some of the profit from these rights into development of the game.

However, the majority is invested in ensuring that the AFL continues to sustain its future revenues, such as protecting the primacy of the competition, as well as growing its broadcast audience, talent pathways and professionalism to attract the best available players (from junior development programs and high performance athletes from around the world).

As part of its role, the Commission is responsible for the Australian Football Hall of Fame, the AFL men's underage championships and AFL women's underage championships. It was also responsible for senior State of Origin competition from 1991 until it ended in 1999.

Role in national and international game development
The Commission was formed to set policy, and has directed the VFL/AFL (known then as the VFL) as the game's most professional league since December 1985.

In 1993, the AFL Commission assumed control of the league's administration from the AFL Board of Directors (in effect, the 15 AFL clubs at that time). Subsequently, the Board of Directors voted itself out of existence, and a new Memorandum and Articles of Association were adopted for the AFL. It also assumed national governance of the sport (see Principle 2 below) after the ANFC ceased operations in 1995.

This was a significant change of power: between 1985 and 1993, the Commission had required explicit approval by a 75% vote of the League (the teams) for major items such as further expansion, mergers, relocations, and major capital works.

The AFL also created an International Policy in 2005, and absorbed the International Australian Football Council, thus gaining control of the sport worldwide.

In its role as national and international governing body, the AFL Commission also controls and delegates development funding for Australian state and international bodies and leagues. As most of this funding is sourced the revenue and activities associated with the AFL competition, much of the funding is directed to the competition's developing markets. Semi-professional state competitions are generally self-sufficient, and receive a much lower percentage of the AFL's funding. The Commission has established a pathway that features junior Academies and scholarships from representational level up to its member clubs. The highest level is the AFL Academy, with academies for each state being managed by their respective AFL clubs and affiliated governing bodies.

Between 2010 and 2021, the AFL spent between $6–38 million per annum (under 5% of total revenue) on game development grants globally (excluding a one-off COVID-19 Pandemic community football recovery package). With a new TV rights deal in 2022 and to help the game at the grassroots continue its recovery post COVID-19 Pandemic, the Commission increased its community grants to $67 million.

Management of Official Player Recognition for the Sport 
 Australian Football Hall of Fame
 All-Australian Team

Organisation structure and members 
The AFL Commission has a simple structure.  There are formal corporate titles for members which currently consists of a chairman whose role is to oversee meetings and a chief executive officer who typically also oversees the operations of the Australian Football League.

Commissioners are elected by the 18 AFL clubs, who each are entitled to make nominations.  Should an election be necessary, then the membership is decided by a vote of the AFL clubs.  Under the current constitution, member clubs have the power to veto commission decisions with a two thirds vote.

Current Membership 
Current membership of the Commission is:

All-time membership

Chief Executive Officers 
 Gillon McLachlan (2014–)
 Andrew Demetriou (2003–2014)
 Wayne Jackson (1996–2003)
 Ross Oakley (1994–1996)

Chairmen 
 Richard Goyder (2017–)
 Mike Fitzpatrick (2007–2017)
 Ron Evans (1997–2007)
 John Kennedy, Sr. (1993–1997)
 Ross Oakley (1986–1993)

Executive Commissioners 
 Alan Schwab (1986–1993)

Commissioners 
 Professor Helen Milroy (2018–)
 Robin Bishop (2017–)
 Gabrielle Trainor (2016—)
 Andrew Newbold (2016–)
 Simone Wilkie (2015–)
 Jason Ball (2015–)
 Kim Williams (2014–)
 Paul Bassat (2011–)
 Richard Goyder (2011–)
 Linda Dessau (2009–2015)
 Christopher Lynch (2009–2014)
 Sam Mostyn (2005–2016)
 Andrew Demetriou (2004–2016)
 Mike Fitzpatrick (2003–2017)
 Bob Hammond (2001–2011)
 Graeme John (2001–2011)
 Chris Langford (1999–2016)
 Bill Kelty (1998–2015)
 David Shaw (1997–1998)
 Craig Kimberley (1997–1998)
 Wayne Jackson (1995–2003)
 Colin Carter (1993–2007)
 Terry O’Connor (1993–2000)
 John Kennedy, Sr. (1993–1997)
 John Winneke (1993–1994)
 Michael Carlile (1991–1992)
 Albert Mantello (1988–1992)
 Ross Oakley (1986–1996)
 Graeme Samuel (1985–2002)
 Peter Scanlon (1985–1992)
 Peter Nixon (1985–1990)
 Richard Seddon (1985–1987)

Life Members 
 Colin Carter (2009)
 Graeme Samuel (1995)

Club and Competition Intervention 
The AFL Commission has also become involved in Australian Football League matters on occasion, both on and off-field. Sometimes these interventions have been in controversial circumstances.

On the field 
 The "Line in the Sand" match in 2004 in which 18 players were reported on 26 charges arising from a third-quarter brawl. Four Hawthorn players were suspended for a total of 15 matches while Essendon's Justin Murphy was suspended for one match.
  2006 Aurora Stadium Siren Controversy – investigated the disputed finish to the St. Kilda vs. Fremantle match played at Aurora Stadium on 30 April 2006. The result was that the AFL commission overturned the drawn result to award Fremantle four premiership points instead of two.
 The six-match suspension handed to  defender Tom Jonas for intentionally striking 's Andrew Gaff in round 9 of the 2016 AFL season.
 The five-match suspension handed to  forward Jeremy Cameron for his crude hit on  fullback Harris Andrews in round 14 of the 2018 AFL season. Cameron became the first player in league history to be sent straight to the tribunal more than once in his career.
 The two-match suspension handed to  captain Ben Stratton, one each for repeatedly pinching 's Orazio Fantasia and for stomping Shaun McKernan, in round 13 of the 2019 AFL season.
A successful appeal from the AFL saw the suspension increased to six matches.

Off the field 
The commission has become involved when players or a club bring the game into disrepute, including:

 Salary cap breaches by the Carlton Football Club in 2002 which hampered the club from rebuilding its playing list in the short-term and long-term future, and which has resulted in continued poor on-field results to this day.
 2007 investigation into the West Coast Eagles party in Las Vegas, Nevada, United States, after the 2006 AFL Grand Final.  During the Las Vegas parties, Ben Cousins rehabilitation from drug addiction, Daniel Kerr's criminal charges and the hospitalisation of Chad Fletcher after choking on his own vomit were part of the issues following the overseas trip.
 The trading out of Brendan Fevola from the Carlton Football Club over his behaviour at the 2009 Brownlow Medal function.
 The sacking of  player Daniel Connors over repeated off-field infringements during his playing career with the club, including a drunken rampage in Sydney in 2010 and "failing to meet club expectations on a number of occasions" in 2012.
 Claims during 2012 that  deliberately lost matches towards the end of the 2009 season so it could attain a priority draft pick at that year's end-of-season draft.
 2012 overhaul of the Port Adelaide Football Club including the sacking of senior coach Matthew Primus and president Brett Duncanson
 2013 investigation into reports of the use of illegal supplements by the Essendon Football Club
 2013 overhaul of the Melbourne Football Club including the sacking of senior coach Mark Neeld
 The club-imposed five-match suspension handed to  player Toby Greene for intentionally assaulting a security guard at a Melbourne nightclub during the club's bye week in 2014, in between which the Giants suffered two defeats in excess of more than 100 points.
 The six-month suspension handed to  player Lachie Whitfield for attempting to invade a random drug test during the 2016–17 off-season, which took in missing the first eight matches of the 2017 AFL season. Ex-GWS employees Graeme Allan and Craig Lambert were both suspended for twelve months each, while the club was also stripped of its first-round draft pick in the 2017 AFL draft.
 The season-ending suspension handed to Sydney Swans player Elijah Taylor for a major breach of Western Australia's strict quarantine rules while the club was in the state during the 2020 season and his subsequent dismissal from the club at the end of the season for assaulting his ex-partner.

Expansion 
The AFL Commission has a role in undertaking assessments of expansion clubs and awarding new licences including:
 Gold Coast Suns
 Greater Western Sydney Giants
 Ongoing Tasmanian AFL team bid

The Commission owns a stake in the Gold Coast and Greater Western Sydney clubs.

Member club viability 
The AFL Commission manages a special fund called the Competitive Balance Fund (CBF) since 2004 as a grant of up to $5 million per club to ensure that member clubs remain financially viable.

The system was later changed to the Annual Special Distribution (ASD) of $6.3 million shared among all clubs, as well as allowing for grants and special concessions, such as payments, to ensure that the AFL member clubs remain viable in the short term. In 2006, the Commission approved a $2.1 million special financial assistance package for Carlton.

In response to clubs increasingly relying on and applying for special funding, in 2008, the Commission recommended removing the fund altogether, but after considerable club protests led by three struggling clubs, the Western Bulldogs, Melbourne and North Melbourne, CEO Andrew Demetriou announced that the ASD would remain.

In early 2009, it increased Melbourne's assistance from $250,000 to $1 million and made a $1 million grant to Port Adelaide.

References

External links
 AFL Info Sheet "AFL Commission"
 FAQ for rec.sport.football.australian

Commission
Commission
Australian rules football governing bodies
Sports governing bodies in Australia
1985 establishments in Australia
Sports organizations established in 1985